Libyan Arabic, also called Sulaimitian Arabic by scholars, is a variety of Arabic spoken in Libya, and neighboring countries. It can be divided into two major dialect areas; the eastern centred in Benghazi and Bayda, and the western centred in Tripoli and Misrata. The Eastern variety extends beyond the borders to the east and share the same dialect with far Western Egypt, Western Egyptian Bedawi Arabic, with between 90,000 and 402,000 speakers in Egypt. A distinctive southern variety, centered on Sabha, also exists and is more akin to the western variety. Another Southern dialect is also shared along the borders with Niger with 12,000 speakers in Niger as of 2019.

Note on transcription notation
The transcription of Libyan Arabic into Latin script poses a few problems. First, there is not one standard transcription in use even for Modern Standard Arabic. The use of the International Phonetic Alphabet alone is not sufficient as it obscures some points that can be better understood if several different allophones in Libyan Arabic are transcribed using the same symbol.

On the other hand, Modern Standard Arabic transcription schemes, while providing good support for representing Arabic sounds that are not normally represented by the Latin script, do not list symbols for other sounds found in Libyan Arabic.

Therefore, to make this article more legible, DIN 31635 is used with a few additions to render phonemes particular to Libyan Arabic. These additions are as follow:

History
Two major historical events have shaped the Libyan dialect: the Hilalian-Sulaimi migration, and the migration of Arabs from al-Andalus to the Maghreb following the Reconquista. Libyan Arabic has also been influenced by the  Greek and  Italian, and to a lesser extent by Turkish. A significant Berber and Latin (African Romance) substratum also exists.

Domains of use
The Libyan dialect is used predominantly in spoken communication in Libya. It is also used in Libyan folk poetry, TV dramas and comedies, songs, as well as in cartoons. Libyan Arabic is also used as a lingua franca by non-Arab Libyans whose mother tongue is not Arabic. Libyan Arabic is not normally written, as the written register is normally Modern Standard Arabic, but Libyan Arabic is the main language for cartoonists, and the only suitable language for writing Libyan folk poetry. It is also written in internet forums, emails and in instant messaging applications.

Phonology

The following table shows the consonants used in Libyan Arabic. Note: some sounds occur in certain regional varieties while being completely absent in others.

In western dialects, the interdental fricatives  have merged with the corresponding dental stops .

The e and o vowels exist only in long form. This can be explained by the fact that these vowels were originally diphthongs in Classical Arabic with  replacing  and  replacing .

Libyan Arabic has at least three clicks, which are used interjectionally, a trait shared with the Bedouin dialects of central Arabia.  The first is used for affirmative responses and is generally considered very casual and sometimes associated with low social status. The second is a dental click and used for negative responses and is similar to the English 'tut'. The third is a palatal click used exclusively by women having a meaning close to that of the English word 'alas'.

Syllable structure
Although Western Libyan Arabic allows for the following syllable structure to occur.

syllable: C1(C2)V1(V2)(C3)(C4)
(C = consonant, V = vowel, optional components are in parentheses.)

An anaptyctic  is inserted between C3 and C4 to ease pronunciation, changing the structure above into the following.
C1(C2)V1(V2)(C3)(əC4).
On the other hand, Eastern Libyan always has an  anaptyctic  between C1 and C2 in the following manner.
C1(əC2)V1(V2)(C3)(C4).

Vocabulary
Most of the vocabulary in Libyan Arabic is of Old Arabic origin, usually with a modified interconsonantal vowel structure. Many Italian loanwords also exist, in addition to Turkish, Berber, Spanish, and English words.

Relation to Classical Arabic vocabulary
The bulk of vocabulary in Libyan Arabic has the same meaning as in Classical Arabic. However, many words have different but related meanings to those of Classical Arabic. The following table serves to illustrate this relation. The past tense is used in the case of verbs as it is more distinctive and has been traditionally used in Arabic lexicons. Canonically, these verbs are pronounced with the final 'a' (marker of the past tense in Classical Arabic). This notation is preserved the table below. However, the relation between Libyan and Classical Arabic verbs can be better understood if the final 'a' is dropped, in accordance with the elision rule of pre-pause vowels of Classical Arabic.

1. Western Libyan pronunciation is used in the above table.

Italian loanwords

Italian loanwords exist mainly, but not exclusively, as a technical jargon. For example, machinery parts, workshop tools, electrical supplies, names of fish species, etc.

Turkish loanwords
Turkish words were borrowed during the Ottoman era of Libya. Words of Turkish origin are not as common as Italian ones.

Berber loanwords
Before the mass Arabization of what corresponds to modern-day Libya, Berber was the native language for most people. This led to the borrowing of a number of Berber words in Libyan Arabic. Many Berber-speaking people continue to live in Libya today but it is not clear to what extent Berber language continues to influence Libyan Arabic.

Grammar
Libyan Arabic shares the feature of the first person singular initial n- with the rest of the Maghrebi Arabic dialect continuum to which it belongs. Like other colloquial Arabic dialects, Libyan does not mark grammatical cases by declension. However, it has a rich verbal conjugation structure.

Nouns
Nouns in Libyan Arabic are marked for two grammatical genders, termed masculine and feminine, and three grammatical numbers, singular, dual and plural. Paucal number also exists for some nouns. The diminutive is also still widely used productively (especially by women) to add an endearing or an empathetic connotation to the original noun. As in Classical Arabic, rules for the diminutive formation are based on vowel apophony.

Indefiniteness is not marked. Definite nouns are marked using the Arabic definite article but with somewhat different rules of pronunciation:

Except for the letter j , moon letters in Libyan Arabic are the same as in Classical Arabic even for letters that have become different phonemes such as q changing to g. The letter j , which corresponds to the Modern Standard Arabic phoneme , has changed from a moon letter to a sun letter.
 For nouns beginning with sun letters, which, in Libyan Arabic, include the letter j , the definite article is pronounced , with the first consonant geminated.

Dual
While marking verbs for the dual number has been lost completely in Libyan Arabic as in other Arabic varieties, nouns have a specialized dual number form. However, in Eastern Libyan it tends to be more widespread.

Demonstratives
Various sets of demonstratives exist in Libyan Arabic. Following is a list of some of these. Note that the grouping in columns does not necessarily reflect grouping in reality:

Verbs
Similar to Classical Arabic stem formation is an important morphological aspect of Libyan Arabic. However, stems III and X are unproductive whereas stems IV and IX do not exist. The following table shows Classical Arabic stems and their Libyan Arabic counterparts.

Tripoli dialect is used in the table above

Conjugation
Like Classical Arabic and other Arabic dialects, Libyan Arabic distinguishes between two main categories of roots: strong roots (those that do not have vowels or hamza) and weak roots.

Conjugation of strong roots 
Strong roots follow more predictable rules of conjugation, and they can be classified into three categories for Stem I in Western Libyan Arabic:

 i-verbs (e.g. k-t-b to write) follow an interconsonantal vowel structure that is predominated by an i (normally pronounced [ə])
 a-verbs (e.g. r-k-b to mount, to ascend) follow an interconsonantal vowel structure that is predominated by an a
 u-verbs (e.g. r-g-ṣ to dance) follow an interconsonantal vowel structure that is predominated by an u

Note that this classification is not always strictly followed. Also, a-verbs and u-verbs follow the same rules in the past conjugation.

1. The i in an i-verb is usually pronounced .
2. In roots with initial uvular, pharyngeal and glottal phonemes ( but not ), i in the present and imperative is pronounced .

1.Realized variously as a and ɑ depending on the consonant structure of the word.

1.

Conjugation in the Eastern Libyan Arabic is more fine grained, yielding a richer structure.

Future tense
Thus, 'tiktəb' (she writes) becomes 'btiktəb' (she will write). It should not be confused with the indicative marker common in some Eastern Arabic varieties.

Intelligibility with other varieties of Arabic
Libyan Arabic is highly intelligible to Tunisians and to a good extent to eastern Algerians. However, for Middle Eastern and Egyptian Arabic speakers, Libyan can be extremely difficult to understand as it is a Maghrebi dialect which is highly influenced by Tamazigh, Italian and Turkish words.

Libyans usually have to substitute some Libyan Arabic words to make themselves understood to other Arabic speakers, especially Middle Easterners. Substitute words are usually borrowed from Modern Standard or Egyptian Arabic. The following table shows some of the commonly replaced words:

Generally, all Italian and to some extent Turkish loanwords are substituted.

If a word is replaced, it does not mean that it is exclusively Libyan. The situation sometimes arises because the speaker mistakenly guesses that the word does not exist in the hearer's dialect. For example, the word zarda (feast, picnic) has close variants in other Maghrebi dialects but is usually substituted in Maghrebi contexts because most speakers do not know that such variants exist.

Pidgin Libyan Arabic
Pidgin Libyan exists in Libya as a contact language used by non-Arabs, mostly Saharan and sub-Saharan Africans living in Libya. Like other pidgins, it has a simplified structure and limited expressive power.

See also 
Transliteration of Libyan placenames
Varieties of Arabic
Maghrebi Arabic
Tunisian Arabic
Algerian Arabic
Moroccan Arabic

References

Citations

General references 
 Roger Chambard, Proverbes libyens recueillis par R. Ch., ed. by Gilda Nataf & Barbara Graille, Paris, GELLAS-Karthala, 2002 [pp. 465–580: index arabe-français/français-arabe]- 
 Eugenio Griffini, L'arabo parlato della Libia – Cenni grammaticali e repertorio di oltre 10.000 vocaboli, frasi e modi di dire raccolti in Tripolitania, Milano: Hoepli, 1913 (reprint Milano: Cisalpino-Goliardica, 1985)
Elfitoury, Abubaker Abdalla. 1976. A Descriptive Grammar of Libyan Arabic. Ann Arbor: UMI. (Doctoral dissertation, Georgetown University; vi+146pp.)
 Christophe Pereira, Le parler arabe de Tripoli (Libye), Zaragoza: Instituto de Estudios Ilamicós y del oriente próximo, 2010
 Abdulgialil M. Harrama. 1993. "Libyan Arabic morphology: Al-Jabal dialect", University of Arizona PhD dissertation
 Jonathan Owens, "Libyan Arabic Dialects", Orbis 32.1–2 (1983) [actually 1987], p. 97–117
 Jonathan Owens, A Short Reference Grammar of Eastern Libyan Arabic, Wiesbaden: Harrassowitz, 1984. .
 Ester Panetta, "Vocabolario e fraseologia dell’arabo parlato a Bengasi" – (Letter A): Annali Lateranensi 22 (1958) 318–369; Annali Lateranensi 26 (1962) 257–290 – (B) in: A Francesco Gabrieli. Studi orientalistici offerti nel sessantesimo compleanno dai suoi colleghi e discepoli, Roma 1964, 195–216 – (C) : AION n.s. 13.1 (1964), 27–91 – (D) : AION n.s. 14.1 (1964), 389–413 – (E) : Oriente Moderno 60.1–6 (1980), 197–213

External links